Stenoptilodes thrasydoxa is a moth of the family Pterophoridae that is known from Colombia.

Adults are on wing in May and July.

External links

thrasydoxa
Moths described in 1926
Endemic fauna of Colombia
Moths of South America